Tsaravary is a rural municipality in Madagascar. It belongs to the district of Mananjary, which is a part of Vatovavy. The population of the commune was estimated to be approximately 27,000 in 2001 commune census.

Geography
Tsaravary is situated at the Mananjary River, the  National Road 25 and at 8km distance from Mananjary.

Only primary schooling is available. The majority 54% of the population of the commune are farmers.  The most important crop is rice, while other important products are lychee, cassava and potatoes. Services provide employment for 1% of the population. Additionally fishing employs 45% of the population.

References 

Populated places in Vatovavy